Assa may refer to:

Places
 Assa (Chalcidice), a town of Chalcidice in ancient Macedonia, Greece
 Assa, Morocco, a town in Southern Morocco in the Jbel Ouarkziz
 Asa River (Kazakhstan), river in Kyrgyzstan and Kazakhstan
 Assa (river), river in Georgia and Russia

Other
 Assa Abloy, Swedish manufacturer of locks and security doors
 Assa darlingtoni, one of two Pouched Frogs in the genus, Assa
 Assa (film), a Soviet 1987 film by Sergei Solovyov, which is associated with Russian rock
 Assa (genus), a zoological genus of pouched frogs in the family Myobatrachidae
 Asa language, alternative spelling for Aasáx, the language of the Assa people
 Asa people, a people of northern Tanzania
 Astronomical Society of Southern Africa
 Astronomical Society of South Australia

See also
 ASSA (disambiguation)